Livoberezhnyi neighborhood can refer to the following residential neighborhoods in Ukraine:
 Livoberezhnyi neighborhood, Kyiv, a neighborhood in the Ukrainian capital
 Livoberezhnyi neighborhood, Dnipro, a neighborhood of the city of Dnipro